Carsten Jensen (born 24 July 1952, Marstal, Denmark) is a Danish author and political columnist. He first earned recognition as a literary critic for the Copenhagen daily, Politiken. His novels, including I Have Seen the World Begin (1996), deal with knowledge of the world. For this novel he won the Danish booksellers award De Gyldne Laurbær (The Golden Laurel) in 1996. The year 2006 saw the publication of his novel Vi, de druknede (We, the Drowned), a chronicle about the birth of modern Denmark, seen through the history of his hometown Marstal. 

In 2009, he was awarded the Olof Palme Prize. In 2012 he was awarded the Søren Gyldendal Prize.

In 2015, Den første sten (The First Stone) appeared, a monumental novel about the experiences of a group of Danish soldiers who have volunteered for service in Afghanistan. Through their eyes, we are presented with a wide and disturbing panorama of the war in Afghanistan. As of March 2018, the novel has been translated into German, Der erste Stein, as well as into Norwegian and Swedish. The English translation was released on 1 September 2019.

Bibliography
 Salg, klasse og død (1975)
 Sjælen sidder i øjet (1985)
 På en mørkeræd klode (1986)
 Souvenirs fra 80'erne (1988)
 Kannibalernes nadver (1988)
 Jorden i munden (1991)
 Af en astmatisk kritikers bekendelser (1992)
 Forsømmelsernes bog (1993)
 Jeg har set verden begynde (1996)
 Jeg har hørt et stjerneskud (1997)
 År to & tre (1999)
 Oprøret mod tyngdeloven (2001)
 Jorden rundt (2003)
 Livet i Camp Eden (2004)
 Det glemte folk – en rejse i Burmas grænseland (2004)
 Vi, de druknede (2006)
 Sidste rejse (2007)
 Vi sejlede bare – virkeligheden bag Vi, de druknede (2009)
 Ud (2010)
 Den første sten (2015)
 Krigen der aldrig ender. News stories from Afghanistan. Co-author: Anders Hammer. (Gyldendal 2016)
 Kældermennesker. (Politikens Forlag 2018)

References

External links
 Official website (English version).
 Carsten Jensen talks about his epic book We, the Drowned (Vi,de Druknede) in an audio slideshow on The Interview Online (In English).
 Finnish review about Vi, de druknede in Opettaja magazine 33/2009

1952 births
Living people
People from Ærø Municipality
Danish people of Romani descent
Danish male writers
Olof Palme Prize laureates
Politiken writers